George D. "Pete" Morrison (August 8, 1890 – February 5, 1973) was an American silent western film actor born in Westminster, Colorado. During his childhood he lived in Morrison, Colorado (named for his grandfather George Morrison) and Idaho Springs, and got his early tastes of horsemanship riding with his father Thomas during the summer. They drove cattle and sheep from the summer ranges in Middle Park and Fall River in Colorado to supply beef and mutton to the mining camps of Georgetown, Idaho Springs, Nevadaville, Black Hawk and Central City. During his mid-teens Pete worked in the mining industry, with his older brothers driving in sections of the Argo Tunnel where Pete was a motorman, hoist operator, topside helper, teamster hauler, assisting several of the larger miners in the Idaho Springs area. In the summer of 1910 Pete Morrison was an engine fireman for the Colorado and Southern Railway when he was lured away by the early western movies. Pete began working as a stunt man for the Essanay Studios of Broncho Billy films, soon discovering he could make more money working in movies in two weeks than he could make working for a month on the railroad. Pete followed his older brother Chick Morrison to California, where he also became a star in early western pictures. Through his career, Morrison transcended from very early film in 1909 to sound in 1935 starring in some 132 pictures.

Film career

Pete Morrison began work with the American Film Manufacturing Company, but soon was signed by Universal Studios and appeared in western serials and short films. Over time Morrison worked with many of the famous actors of his time, including Tom Mix, Wallace, Noah Beery and John Barry. He starred with Charlotte Burton in films such as The Bruiser in 1916. He took some time away from movies to travel the country in a Wild West Show, then returned and did numerous Westerns for Triangle and Universal. He agreed to make a series of pictures in Central and South America, but eventually returned to Universal. With the arrival of sound pictures, his career declined somewhat and he went into supporting roles in movies, then retired in 1935, aged 45. He appeared inScarface, Cleopatra, and The Big Trail where he met a young newcomer who happened to share his last name, Marion "Duke" Morrison, and reputedly taught the rising star Morrison some of his moves. The younger Morrison later gained fame as John Wayne.

Retirement from acting, later career, and death
In 1935 Pete Morrison retired and settled on his ranch near Golden, Colorado which he had purchased in 1926.  There he lived with his family including wife Lillian (née Knapp) whom he married in 1912, and sons Clifford E. and Douglas K. Morrison. Pete became a deputy sheriff of Jefferson County, Colorado in 1936, and remained so for 37 years.  He was also a member of the Golden Masonic Lodge, the Genesee Group and Jefferson County Sheriff's Posse.  He ranched and farmed along with several outside jobs until his final retirement in the early 1960s. Pete Morrison died in Los Angeles, California on February 5, 1973, of an abdominal aneurysm at the age of 82. He is buried in the Golden Cemetery, along with other members of his family.

The Pete Morrison Collection of his movie career paraphernalia now resides at the Golden Landmarks Association in Golden, Colorado. Pete's career is featured in a historic mural near Bear Creek Avenue in Morrison, Colorado, as well as in a book about Essanay Studios.

Selected filmography

The Golden Landmarks Association offers a more complete list of his films, said to number between 132 and 204 in total. Many were produced at his own studio, Lariat Productions, at Universal Studios.

References

External links

 

1890 births
1973 deaths
People from Westminster, Colorado
Male actors from Colorado
American male film actors
Male Western (genre) film actors
American male silent film actors
20th-century American male actors
People from Morrison, Colorado